Oranjestad West It is one of the 9 regions into which the Caribbean island of Aruba, an autonomous country within the Kingdom of the Netherlands, is divided.

Geography
It is located northwest of the main island of Aruba, south of Region Noord (or northern region), west of Paradera and north of Oranjestad Oost.

Oranjestad West has an area of 9.29 square kilometers and a population of 13,976 people for the year 2010 which represents an increase from the year 2000 when it registered 12,131 people and the 1991 census when it had 8779.

Tourism

Featured Sites
Eagle Beach
 Divi Beach
 Aruba Cruise Terminal
 Beach Tennis Aruba

References 

Regions of Aruba